Jangipur is a proposed district in Malda division, West Bengal. The district will be formed by dividing the Murshidabad district.

History 
On 1 August 2022, Chief Minister of West Bengal Mamata Banerjee declared the creation of Berhampore district craving out from Murshidabad district.

Education

College

Health facilities 
 .

References

Proposed districts of West Bengal